Blesdijke is a village in Weststellingwerf in the province of Friesland, the Netherlands. It had a population of around 460 in 2008.

History 
The village was first mentioned in 1350 as Blesdic, and means dike at a bare spot. Blesdijke developed in late middle ages on the road from Oldemarkt to Noordwolde. The Dutch Reformed church dates from 1843 and has a wooden tower. The building is a replacement for a church which collapsed in 1836.

Blesdijke was home to 393 people in 1840.

Castle Old Stoutenburght is a folly which pretends to be a medieval castle.

Gallery

References

External links

Geography of Weststellingwerf
Populated places in Friesland